Pholidoteuthis is a genus of squid in the monotypic family Pholidoteuthidae, comprising at least two species. The defunct genus Tetronychoteuthis was previously incorporated into Pholidoteuthidae based upon a singular taxon known as Tetronychoteuthis massyae. Following the discovery of Pholidoteuthis boschmai in 1950, T. massaye was placed into Pholidoteuthis, with Tetronoychoteuthis considered a nomen dubium. P. boschmai is now considered a junior synonym of P. massyae.

Species
Pholidoteuthis adami Voss, 1956
Pholidoteuthis massyae (Pfeffer, 1912) – coffeebean scaled squid

References

External links

Pholidoteuthis discussion forum at TONMO.com
Tree of Life web project:Pholidoteuthis

Squid
Cephalopod genera